Dottikon ES (Legally: Dottikon ES Holding AG) is a Swiss multinational corporation founded in 1913 that is specialized in chemical reactions and develops and produces chemicals, intermediate goods and active exclusive ingredients for the chemical, biotechnology and pharmaceutical industries. Formerly belonging to EMS-Chemie (independent since 2002), Dottikon ES has approximately 665 employees and had an annual net turnover of 251.9 million Swiss Francs (2020/21) as well as a net profit of 59.3 million Swiss Francs. Since 2005, Dottikon ES has been listed at SIX Swiss Exchange.

References

External links 
 Dottikon ES (official website) 

Multinational companies
International business organizations
Companies of Switzerland